The Children's Book Circle (CBC) is a not-for-profit organisation, founded in 1962, that supports the British children's book industry. Members range from authors and publishers to librarians, designers, illustrators and booksellers. The CBC facilitates the Eleanor Farjeon Award and the Patrick Hardy Lecture, and organises speaker meetings and social events in London.

References

External links
 Official website

Children's literature organizations
Arts organizations established in 1962
1962 establishments in the United Kingdom